Great Greed, known in Japan as , is an environmentally-themed role-playing video game for the Nintendo Game Boy released by Namco in 1992.

Story
The game's plot deals with a protagonist whose name that the player sets, but referred to as "Sierra Sam" in the game's promotional materials. Sam, a resident of the "real world," is transported to the fictional world of Greene in order to prevent Biohazard Harry (simply referred to as "Bio-Haz" in the game) from continuing to pollute Greene, a world of seven nations. Sam finds himself stuck in Greene because Microwave, who brought him there in the first place, lost her power in the previous battle.
Sam's adventures range from collecting debut records to helping to expose a corrupt politician.

Gameplay

The game plays similarly to many other RPGs of the time, although there are a few significant differences. The graphics are very similar to those of Final Fantasy Legend and Final Fantasy Legend 2. However, battles are reminiscent of Dragon Warrior. Only one character fights (Sam), and only one monster fights at a time. The game features random encounter battles, and the player's progress can be saved anytime, except during battle, by using the select button. Additionally, most of the characters, enemies, and towns in the game are named after different types of food or food-related products.

Through the menu screen, the player can talk to the party for information on where to go next.

Battle
Each battle action in Great Greed is assigned to a button.  The "A" button attacks, the "B" button defends and the "Start" button attempts to escape from the battle.  Magic scrolls that the player has found or purchased can be set to one of the four directional buttons on the directional pad, with "Down" being the only direction in which the player can assign a healing spell. Sam and the enemy attack at the same time, with healing occurring before attacking.

Multiple endings
At the end of the game, the king asks the player if they wish the main character to marry one of his daughters. Out of his five daughters, Gum Drop is engaged to be married, while the other four (Cup Cake, Citrus, Candy, and Truffle) are presented as available (although Princess Cup Cake is only eleven years old, and the king states the main character will have to wait until she's grown). While the player can pick any of the four, they can also talk Gum Drop out of her betrothal upon repeated interaction.

In addition, the player is also able (with repeated interaction) to talk the Court Witch (Microwave), Chief of Bodyguards (Lunch Box), Court Administrator (either Time Out or Lunch Break because of a localization inconsistency), or even break up the marriage of the king and queen to marry someone out of any of the ten characters present in the final scene.

References

External links
Great Greed at MobyGames
JPgbx

1992 video games
Environmental mass media
Fantasy video games
Game Boy-only games
Namco games
Role-playing video games
Single-player video games
Game Boy games
Video games developed in Japan
LGBT-related video games